Dongyang (东阳市) is a county-level city in Zhejiang province, China.

Dongyang or Tongyang may also refer to:

Places
The Orient, in Chinese and Korean
Dongyang, Liuyang (洞阳镇), a town in Liuyang city, Hunan province, China

Organisations
Dong Yang Animation Co., LTD, South Korean animation studio
Tongyang Group, former South Korean conglomerate
Dongyang Cement, South Korean cement company now known as Sampyo Cement
Orion Confectionery, established in 1956 as Tongyang Confectionery Corp
Tongyang Broadcasting Company, former South Korean broadcasting company merged into KBS in 1980
Dongyang University, university in Yeongju, South Korea

See also
Dong Yang (born 1983), Chinese football player
Li Dongyang (1447–1516), Ming Dynasty scholar